Ugia signifera is a species of moth in the family Erebidae. It is found in Indonesia (Sumatra) and on Borneo and Peninsular Malaysia.

References

Moths described in 1863
Ugia